Penllergaer is a village and community in the City and County of Swansea, Wales, to the east of Gorseinon, within the electoral ward of the same name. It is situated about 4.5 miles north west of Swansea city centre, near junction 47 of the M4 motorway.
The population of the community and ward was 2,868 in 2011.

Features
Penllergaer Woods, on the edge of the Parc Penllergaer housing development, once formed part of John Dillwyn Llewelyn's Penllergare estate and surrounded his mansion house. The first photographs of the moon were taken at Dillwyn Llewelyn's observatory, which still stands.

Penllergaer Trust- The Penllergare Trust was formed as an independent charity in 2000 - completely independent of the local council and of Government. It has relied on donations, legacies and money raised from activities and commercial operations for income and it has been supported by a Friends group and many volunteers and schools without whom it simply could not manage. Together with its supporters, The Penllergare Trust aims to protect Penllergare Valley Woods and open them to the public as a valuable community asset for the whole of Swansea and beyond.

During World War II, the estate was purchased by the missionary Rees Howells and the mansion was offered as a residence to the exiled Emperor Haile Selassie of Ethiopia.

Education
Penllergaer Primary School was built in 1881, and moved to its present site, on Pontardulais Road, in 1976.

Religion
Penllergaer has a Church in Wales church named St David's, and the present Vicar is the Reverend Dr. John Gillibrand (FAB). The church is located on Swansea Road, the vicarage being opposite.

Public services
Penllergaer has a regular bus service to Morriston, Swansea and Gorseinon. Penllergar also has a post Office, one village shop and a park.

Local government
Penllergaer is administered by the City and County of Swansea Council and an elected member for Penllergaer sits on the County Council.

Penllergaer has its own elected Community Council.

Sport
Penllergaer has its own village rugby and football teams, the football teams play in Camarthenshire League, the 1st team in Division 2 and the reserves in Reserve Division 2.

Neighboring places
The nearby places are Garden Village, Gorseinon, Fforestfach, Llangyfelach, Grovesend, Pontlliw and Felindre.

References

Communities in Swansea
Swansea Bay (region)
Villages in Swansea